Nationality words link to articles with information on the nation's poetry or literature (for instance, Irish or France).

Events
 June 3 – American writer Ernest Thayer's baseball poem "Casey at the Bat" is first published (under the pen name "Phin") as the last of his humorous contributions to The San Francisco Examiner.

Works published

Canada
William Wilfred Campbell, Snowflakes and sunbeams. St. Stephen, NB: St. Croix Courier Press. Published at author's expense.
 Archibald Lampman, Among the Millet. His first book of poems,  including "Heat". Published at author's expense.
 Frederick George Scott, The Soul's Quest, and Other Poems.

United Kingdom
 William Allingham, Flower Pieces, and Other Poems, illustrated by Dante Gabriel Rossetti
 Sir Edwin Arnold, translator from the Persian by Sa'di, With Sa'di in the Garden; or, The Book of Love
 Matthew Arnold, Essays in Criticism, Second Series (see also Essays in Criticism 1865, 1910)
 W. E. Henley, A Book of Verses
 Andrew Lang, Grass of Parnassus
 George Meredith, A Reading of Earth
 William Wordsworth, The Recluse, printed from the original manuscript; Wordsworth's plan was to write a long autobiographical poem of three parts and a prelude (see also The Excursion 1814 and The Prelude 1850) posthumously published

United States
 Oliver Wendell Holmes, Before the Curfew and Other Poems
 James Russell Lowell:
 The English Poets; Lessing, Rousseau, nonfiction
 Heartsease and Rue
 Herman Melville, John Marr and Other Sailors
 Thomas Nelson Page and A. C. Gordon, Befo' de War
 James Whitcomb Riley:
 Pipes o' Pan at Zekesbury
 Old-Fashioned Roses
 Ernest Thayer, "Casey at the Bat"
 Walt Whitman, November Boughs

Other
 Rubén Darío, Azul
 James Russell Lowell, Heartsease and Rue
 Władysław Mickiewicz, Adam Mickiewicz, sa vie et son œuvre ("Adam Mickiewicz: His Life and Works"), biography written by and collected works edited by the author's son, translated from the original Polish into French, Paris
 I. L. Peretz, "Monish", Polish poet writing in Yiddish
 Andrejs Pumpurs, Lāčplēsis ("The Bear-Slayer"), Latvia

Awards and honors

Births
Death years link to the corresponding "[year] in poetry" article:
 January 5 – Rosa Zagnoni Marinoni (died 1970), Italian-born American poet
 February 8 – Giuseppe Ungaretti (died 1970), Egyptian-born Italian modernist poet and writer
 February 13 – Desmond FitzGerald (born 1947), English-born Irish revolutionary, poet, publicist and politician
 March 26 – F. W. Harvey (died 1957), English rural poet and soldier
 March 30 – Julian Grenfell (died of wounds 1915), English soldier and poet
 April 6 – Dan Andersson (died 1920), Swedish poet
 April 30 – John Crowe Ransom (died 1974), American poet, essayist, social and political theorist and academic
 June 8 – Senge Motomaro 千家元麿 (died 1948), Japanese, Taishō and Shōwa period poet (surname: Senge)
 June 13 – Fernando Pessoa (died 1935), Portuguese heteronymic poet, writer, critic, translator, publisher and philosopher
 June 22 – Alan Seeger (killed in action 1916), American poet
 August 1 – Aline Kilmer, born Aline Murray (died 1941), American poet, children's book author and essayist; wife of Joyce Kilmer
 September 26 – T. S. Eliot (died 1965), American-born English poet, playwright, editor, critic and writer
 October 1 – Ryuko Kawaji 川路柳虹, pen-name of Kawaki Makoto (died 1959), Japanese, Shōwa period poet and literary critic (surname: Kawaji)
 October 14 – Katherine Mansfield (died 1923), New Zealand modernist poet and short story writer
 October 16 – Eugene O'Neill (died 1953), American playwright
 October 19 – Venkatarama Ramalingam Pillai (died 1972), Indian Tamil-language poet and freedom fighter
 date not known – Nilkanth Sharma Dal (died 1970), Indian, Kashmiri-language poet

Deaths
Birth years link to the corresponding "[year] in poetry" article:
 February 28 (last seen alive) - Black Bart (born 1829), American gentleman stagecoach robber and versifier
 April 15 - Matthew Arnold (born 1822), English poet and critic
 May 12 - Edward Lear (born 1812), English comic poet
 July 30 - María Josefa Mujía (born 1812), blind Bolivian poet
 August 9 - Charles Cros (born 1842), French poet and inventor

See also

 19th century in poetry
 19th century in literature
 List of years in poetry
 List of years in literature
 Victorian literature
 French literature of the 19th century
 Symbolist poetry
 Poetry

Notes

19th-century poetry
Poetry